St Jude's Church is on Nantwich Road (the A51) in Tilstone Fearnall, in the civil parish of Tiverton and Tilstone Fearnall, Cheshire, England.  It is an active Anglican parish church in the deanery of Malpas, the archdeaconry of Chester, and the diocese of Chester.  Its benefice is combined with that of St Boniface, Bunbury.  The church is recorded in the National Heritage List for England as a designated Grade II listed building.  It stands opposite the end of the drive leading to Tilstone Lodge.

History

The church was built in 1836, and designed by George Latham of Nantwich.  It was paid for by Admiral John Tollemache (formerly Halliday), who had earlier built Tilstone Lodge.

Architecture

St Jude's is constructed in yellow sandstone ashlar with a slate roof.  Its plan is rectangular and consists of a nave and chancel in one cell with no division between them, a vestry attached to the east end of the chancel, and a bellcote on the gable at the west end. Above the bellcote is a canopy decorated with crockets.  The west front contains a double door, above which is a triple lancet window with a circular window over it.  At the corners are square turrets which become octagonal as they rise, and each is surmounted by a spire.  On each side of the church are five pairs of lancet windows, each pair being separated by a buttress.  Above the vestry at the east end is another triple lancet window, over which is a cricketed gable.

Inside the church is a west gallery. The reredos is carved with figures in low relief.  There is a memorial to Admiral Tollemache, who died in 1837, and to his wife, who died in 1846.  Stained glass dates from 1987. In the west gallery is a two-manual organ built by Peter Conacher and Company in 1914, and overhauled by the same company in 1965.

External features

The churchyard contains the war graves of two soldiers of World War II.

See also

Listed buildings in Tilstone Fearnall

References

Church of England church buildings in Cheshire
Grade II listed churches in Cheshire
Churches completed in 1836
Diocese of Chester
Gothic Revival church buildings in England
Gothic Revival architecture in Cheshire
Cheshire West and Chester